Greater Israel (Eretz Yisrael Hashlema) is an expression, with several different biblical and political meanings over time. It is often used, in an irredentist fashion, to refer to the historic or desired borders of Israel.

Currently, the most common definition of the land encompassed by the term is the territory of the State of Israel together with the Palestinian territories. An earlier definition, favored by Revisionist Zionism, included the territory of the former Emirate of Transjordan.

History

Promised Land 

The Bible contains three geographical definitions of the Land of Israel. It describes a large territory, "from the brook of Egypt to the Euphrates".

The other definitions are found in the Book of Deuteronomy, the Book of Numbers, and the Book of Ezekiel, . The definition in Numbers and Ezekiel refers to the land that was divided between the original Twelve tribes of Israel after they were delivered from Egypt, and finally, the borders defined in the book of Deuteronomy are those that will be given to the children of Israel slowly throughout the years,  & ).

During British Mandate for Palestine 

Early Revisionist Zionist groups such as Betar and Irgun Zvai-Leumi regarded the territory of the Mandate for Palestine, including Transjordan, as Greater Israel.

In 1937, the Peel Commission recommended partition of Mandatory Palestine. In a letter to his son later that year, David Ben-Gurion stated that partition would be acceptable but as a first step. Ben-Gurion wrote that 
 The same sentiment was recorded by Ben-Gurion on other occasions, such as at a meeting of the Jewish Agency executive in June 1938, as well as by Chaim Weizmann. Ben Gurion said:

During early period of the State of Israel 
Joel Greenberg writing in The New York Times notes: "At Israel's founding in 1948, the Labor Zionist leadership, which went on to govern Israel in its first three decades of independence, accepted a pragmatic partition of what had been British Palestine into independent Jewish and Arab states. The opposition Revisionist Zionists, who evolved into today's Likud party, sought Eretz Yisrael Ha-Shlema—Greater Israel, or literally, the Whole Land of Israel (shalem, meaning complete)." The capture of the West Bank and Gaza Strip from Jordan and Egypt during the Six-Day War in 1967 led to the growth of the non-parliamentary Movement for Greater Israel and the construction of Israeli settlements. The 1977 elections, which brought Likud to power also had considerable impact on acceptance and rejection of the term. Greenberg notes: THE seed was sown in 1977, when Menachem Begin of Likud brought his party to power for the first time in a stunning election victory over Labor. A decade before, in the 1967 war, Israeli troops had in effect undone the partition accepted in 1948 by overrunning the West Bank and Gaza Strip. Ever since, Mr. Begin had preached undying loyalty to what he called Judea and Samaria (the West Bank lands) and promoted Jewish settlement there. But he did not annex the West Bank and Gaza to Israel after he took office, reflecting a recognition that absorbing the Palestinians could turn Israel into a bi-national state instead of a Jewish one.

Yitzhak Shamir was a dedicated proponent of Greater Israel and as Israeli Prime Minister gave the settler movement funding and Israeli governmental legitimisation.

Today 
In a May 1998 interview with ABC's John Miller, Osama bin Laden noted what he saw as "Zionist plans for expansion of what is called the Great Israel ... to achieve full control over the Arab Peninsula which they intend to make an important part of the so called Greater Israel." While not his main reason, Bin Laden included what he saw as American and Western support for such a scheme as an additional motivation for his call to wage war against America and its allies.

Annexation of the West Bank and Gaza Strip was part of the platform of the Israeli Likud party, and of some other Israeli political parties. On September 14, 2008, Israeli Prime Minister Ehud Olmert remarked that "Greater Israel is over. There is no such thing. Anyone who talks that way is deluding themselves".

Meir Kahane, an ultra-nationalist Knesset member, who founded the American Jewish Defense League and the banned Israeli Kach party, worked towards Greater Israel and other Religious Zionist goals.

Currently in Israel, in the debate relating to the borders of Israel, "Greater Israel" is generally used to refer to the territory of the State of Israel and the Palestinian territories, the combined territory of the former Mandatory Palestine. However, because of the controversial nature of the term, the term Land of Israel is often used instead.

10 agorot coin controversy 

Zionists, and the State of Israel, have been accused of plotting to expand Israel from the Nile to the Euphrates. This so-called 10 agorot controversy is named after the Israeli coin brandished by PLO chairman Yasser Arafat in 1988 as evidence for this accusation. The Bank of Israel denies this conspiracy theory since the coin is a replica of a historical coin dating from 37 to 40 BCE and the alleged "map" is actually the irregular shape of the ancient coin.

Israeli flag controversy 
Conspiracy theorists have suggested the blue strips of the Israeli flag represent the Nile and Euphrates as the boundaries of Eretz Isra'el as promised to the Jews by God according to religious scripture. This claim was at a time made by Yasser Arafat, Iran and Hamas. However, both Zionists and Anti-Zionists have debunked this. Danny Rubinstein points out that "Arafat ... added, in interviews that he gave in the past, that the two blue stripes on the Israeli flag represent the Nile and the Euphrates. ... No Israeli, even those who demonstrate understanding for Palestinian distress, will accept the ... nonsense about the blue stripes on the flag, which was designed according to the colours of the traditional tallit (prayer shawl) ..."

In academia 
Hillel Weiss, a professor at Bar-Ilan University, has promoted the "necessity" of rebuilding the Temple and of Jewish rule over Greater Israel.

In politics
The Knesset Land of Israel Caucus, one of the largest lobby groups in the Knesset, has its main goal to strengthen Israel's hold on the West Bank.

See also 
 Canaan
 Greater Palestine
 "The East Bank of the Jordan" (also known as "Two Banks has the Jordan"), a poem by Ze'ev Jabotinsky that became the slogan and one of the most famous songs of Betar
 State of Judea
 Yinon Plan
 Promised Land
 Land of Israel

References

External links 
 For The Land and The Lord: The Range of Disagreement within Jewish Fundamentalism, by Ian Lustick, chapter V and chapter VII (accessed 12 October 2005).
 A collection of maps of Eretz Israel HaShlema (Greater Israel), from GlobalSecurity.org.

Arab–Israeli conflict
Israel
Land of Israel
Neo-Zionism
Conspiracy theories involving Israel